The literature written by Galician authors has been developed in both Galician language literature and Spanish literature. The earliest works written in Galician language are from the early 13th-century trovadorismo tradition. In the Middle Ages, Galego-português (Galician-Portuguese) was a language of culture, poetry (troubadours) and religion throughout not only Galicia and Portugal but also Castile.

After the separation of Portuguese and Galician, Galician was considered provincial and was not widely used for literary or academic purposes. It was with  the Rexurdimento ("Rebirth"), in the mid-19th century that Galician was used again in literature, and then in politics.

Authors

Main authors in both Galician and Spanish

Alfonso X of Castile
Rosalía de Castro
Filomena Dato
Padre Feijoo
Manuel Murguía
Manuel Rivas
Álvaro Cunqueiro
Manuel Curros Enríquez
Eduardo Pondal
Ofelia Rey Castelao 
Vicente Risco
Xohán Vicente Viqueira
Xesús Ferro Couselo
Aurelio Aguirre Galarraga
Celso Emilio Ferreiro
Rafael Dieste
Francisco Añón
Eduardo Blanco Amor

Main authors in Galician

Mendinho
Xurxo Borrazás
Martín Codax
Alfonso Daniel Rodríguez Castelao
Fermín Bouza Brei
Carlos Casares Mouriño
Suso de Toro
Xosé Neira Vilas
Padre Sarmiento
Antón Vilar Ponte
Luís Seoane
Dario Xoan Cabana
Xohán de Cangas
Ánxel Fole
Marilar Aleixandre
María Xosé Queizán
Xohana Torres
Luísa Villalta
Chus Pato
María do Cebreiro
Estíbaliz Espinosa
Berta Dávila
Olga Novo
Ismael Ramos
Gonzalo Hermo

For a more extensive list of Galician language writers, see Día das Letras Galegas.

Main authors in Spanish

Ramón del Valle-Inclán
Camilo José Cela (Nobel Prize for Literature, 1989)
Emilia Pardo Bazán
Concepción Arenal 
Gonzalo Torrente Ballester
Wenceslao Fernández Flórez
Benito Vicetto Pérez
Nicomedes Pastor Díaz
Jacinto Salas y Quiroga
Juan Bautista Alonso
Blanca Andreu
Antonio Francisco de Castro e Iglesias

Other authors
Ignacio Ramonet - works in Spanish and French
Federico García Lorca - the poet from Granada, wrote "Six Galician Poems" in Galician language

See also 
 Galician language literature

Galician
Spanish literature